Nothingface can refer to:

 Nothingface (Voivod album), from 1989
 Nothingface (band), a nu metal band
 Nothingface (Nothingface album), from 1995